Giovanni Agostino De Marini (Genoa, 1572 - Genoa, June 19, 1642) was the 105th Doge of the Republic of Genoa and king of Corsica.

Biography 
On August 14, 1641 De Marini was elected Doge of Genoa, the sixtieth in biennial succession and the one hundred and fifth in republican history. As doge he was also invested with the related biennial office of king of Corsica. Elected probably thanks to the votes of the "new" nobility, which required greater relevance in the European political landscape and a rearmament policy to guarantee the protection of the rivers. He allocated the funds for the construction of twenty galleys and, following the example of the former doge Giacomo Lomellini and Anton Giulio Brignole Sale, he armed one with his money. His political goal was also to improve the relationship between Genoa city and his domain, and therefore he went to Savona to deliver the two galleys prepared by the city. His dogal assignment was interrupted by the illness which after a month, on June 19, 1642, led to his death.

See also 

 Republic of Genoa
 Doge of Genoa

References 

17th-century Doges of Genoa
1572 births
1642 deaths